Gleb Borisovich Smolkin (born 27 August 1999) is a Russian ice dancer. With his partner, Diana Davis, he is the 2021 CS Warsaw Cup champion and the 2022 Russian national silver medalist.

On the junior level, Davis/Smolkin are the 2020 Russian junior national bronze medalists, finished in the top five at the 2020 World Junior Figure Skating Championships, and competed at the 2019–20 Junior Grand Prix Final.

Personal life
Smolkin was born on 27 August 1999 in Saint Petersburg, Russia. He is the son of Russian actor  and his wife Svetlana. He has one half-brother, Vladimir. As of 2022, Gleb is married to his skating partner Diana Davis.

During a hiatus from figure skating in 2014, Smolkin briefly played professional beach soccer as a member of the BSC Lokomotiv Moscow team.

Career

Early years
Smolkin began learning how to skate in 2004. He competed as a single skater until the 2014–15 season when he took a year-long hiatus from the sport. He returned to figure skating in November 2015 to compete as an ice dancer with his first partner, Ekaterina Mironova. The team competed together until spring of 2016 before parting ways. During the 2016–17 season Smolkin teamed up with Svetlana Lizunova, but the partnership was short-lived and lasted only a season before Smolkin began competing with his current partner, Diana Davis, coached by Svetlana Alexeeva and her team in Moscow.

2018–19 season: Junior international debut
Davis/Smolkin made their junior international debut in September 2018 at the 2018 JGP Croatia. The team finished third overall at the event behind Russian teammates Khudaiberdieva/Nazarov in first and Georgian competitors Kazakova/Reviya in second, but despite their podium placement did not receive a second JGP assignment.

The team competed three more times internationally during the season, finishing third in the junior event at the 2018 Volvo Open Cup and second at both the 2018 Tallinn Trophy (junior) and the 2018 Russian-Chinese Youth Winter Games. At the 2019 Russian Junior Figure Skating Championships in February, they finished ninth.

2019–20 season
In the summer before the start of the season, Davis and Smolkin relocated their training base from Moscow to Novi, Michigan to work with Igor Shpilband and Pasquale Camerlengo. The team opened their season in August at the 2019 JGP United States where they won the silver medal behind American training-mates Nguyen/Kolesnik. At their second assignment, 2019 JGP Russia, the team again finished second overall, this time behind fellow Russian competitors Shanaeva/Naryzhnyy, and with 26 qualifying points they advanced to the 2019–20 Junior Grand Prix Final. The team competed just once more before the Junior Grand Prix Final, taking the junior title at the 2019 Volvo Open Cup.

At the 2019–20 Junior Grand Prix Final, Davis/Smolkin entered the competition as the bottom seeded team and had a disappointing outing, finishing sixth in both segments of competition and sixth overall. However, they regrouped in the interim between the Final and the 2020 Russian Junior Championships and managed to earn the bronze medal at junior nationals, earning a spot on Russian team for the 2020 World Junior Championships. Competing at Junior Worlds, Davis/Smolkin scored personal bests in both segments of competition as well as overall, and finished in fifth.

2020–21 season 
After Davis sustained an ankle fracture in July 2020, her long-term recovery and a subsequent illness delayed Davis/Smolkin's return to full-time training. They did not compete at the 2021 Russian Junior Championships in January, but planned to return to Russia for the Russian Cup Final in March. At the Russian Cup Final, Davis/Smolkin placed first in both the rhythm dance and the free dance to take the junior title by a margin of about 5 points over silver medalists Kaganovskaia/Angelopol. They retained their Aristocats rhythm dance from the season prior, but debuted a new free dance to selections from the soundtrack of Moulin Rouge!.

2021–22 season: Senior international debut and Beijing Olympics 
Davis/Smolkin received their first senior-level Grand Prix assignment to the 2021 Skate Canada International, which was not without controversy in Russia as both they and the Morozov/Bagin, another team with political pull with the Russian Figure Skating Federation, received invitations, while other teams with higher rankings did not. In order to guarantee admission to Canada during the pandemic, both were vaccinated with the Pfizer–BioNTech vaccine in addition to having previously received Russia's own Sputnik V vaccine. The team debuted their programs for the Olympic season at the 2021 senior Russian test skates in September.

Davis/Smolkin made their senior international debut the week after test skates at the 2021 U.S. International Classic in Norwood, Massachusetts. At the event, the team won the silver medal behind American team Hubbell/Donohue. Going on to the Grand Prix, they placed fifth at Skate Canada International with new personal bests in both segments and overall. 

Following their stint on the Grand Prix circuit, Davis/Smolkin competed at back-to-back ISU Challenger Series events in November. At the 2021 CS Cup of Austria, they finished just off the podium in fourth and set new personal bests in both segments of competition, as well as overall. Davis/Smolkin then competed at the 2021 CS Warsaw Cup, where they won their first international title. They upgraded their three new personal bests previously set at Cup of Austria the week before to take the gold medal ahead of Japanese team Muramoto/Takahashi in second, and American team Green/Parsons in third.

At their first senior Russian Championships in December, Davis/Smolkin controversially placed third in the rhythm dance ahead of longtime Russian number three team Zahorski/Guerreiro, outscoring them in the segment by over five points. In the free dance, Davis/Smolkin were able to capitalize on the withdrawal of top Russian team Sinitsina/Katsalapov due to injury and advance to second in the segment. They took the silver medal behind new national champions Stepanova/Bukin. Their placement was, again, not without controversy, with even bronze medalist Egor Bazin questioning the fairness of the scoring. As a result of their placement, Davis/Smolkin were assigned to the 2022 European Championships as one of three dance teams representing Russia.

Davis/Smolkin made their European Championships debut in January in Tallinn, Estonia. They placed eighth in the rhythm dance and seventh in the free dance to place seventh overall. When asked about the controversies surrounding their national placements, Smolkin remarked "after the Russian nationals, we stopped paying attention to all that. We let the redundant things go."

Davis/Smolkin were officially named to the Russian team for the 2022 Winter Olympics on 20 January. Competing in the 2022 Winter Olympics dance event, they placed fourteenth in the rhythm dance. Afterward the team rebuffed queries from reporters about a burgeoning doping scandal involving Kamila Valieva, a student of Davis' mother Eteri Tutberidze. Davis/Smolkin held their standing of fourteenth place in the free dance to finish fourteenth overall in their Olympic debut.

Programs

With Davis

Competitive highlights 
GP: Grand Prix; JGP: Junior Grand Prix

With Davis

Detailed results 
Small medals for short and free programs awarded only at ISU Championships.

With Davis

Senior results

Junior results

References

 1999 births
Living people
 Russian male ice dancers
 Figure skaters from Saint Petersburg
Figure skaters at the 2022 Winter Olympics
Olympic figure skaters of Russia